Doctor Shariati Metro Station is a station in Tehran Metro Line 1. It is located in Shariati Street. It is between Mirdamad Metro Station and Gholhak Metro Station. It was opened on 19 May 2009.

Facilities
The station has a ticket office, escalators, cash machines, toilets, pay phones, water fountains, and a lost and found.

References

Tehran Metro stations
Railway stations opened in 2009